The term Weil conjecture may refer to:

The Weil conjectures about zeta functions of varieties over finite fields, proved by Dwork, Grothendieck, Deligne and others.
The Taniyama–Shimura–Weil conjecture about elliptic curves, proved by Wiles and others.
The Weil conjecture on Tamagawa numbers about the Tamagawa number of an algebraic group, proved by Kottwitz and others.
The Hasse–Weil conjecture about zeta functions.